Brazen Hussies may refer to:

 Brazen Hussies (2020 film)
 Brazen Hussies, a 1996 film with Barbara Durkin
 Brazen Hussies, a 1996 BBC comedy play with Julie Walters
 The Brazen Hussies, a science fiction writer's group comprising Pat Murphy, Lisa Goldstein, and Michaela Roessner